Mariano "Mono" Joaquín Baracetti (born July 12, 1974, in Buenos Aires) is a beach volleyball player from Argentina, who won the world title at the 2001 Beach Volleyball World Championships in Klagenfurt, Austria partnering Martín Conde. He represented his native country at three consecutive Summer Olympics, starting in 2000 (Sydney, Australia).

References

1974 births
Living people
Argentine beach volleyball players
Men's beach volleyball players
Beach volleyball players at the 2000 Summer Olympics
Beach volleyball players at the 2004 Summer Olympics
Beach volleyball players at the 2008 Summer Olympics
Olympic beach volleyball players of Argentina
Volleyball players from Buenos Aires